El octavo mandamiento is a Mexican telenovela that premiered on Cadenatres on 8 August 2011, and concluded on 12 February 2012. The telenovela is created by Laura Sosa and Epigmenio Ibarra, and produced by Argos Comunicación for Cadenatres. It stars Saúl Lisazo, Sara Maldonado, Leticia Huijara, Erik Hayser, and Ximena Rubio.

Plot 
The telenovela tells the real situation that thousands of families lived on that fateful September 11 that changed the history of humanity. The plot begins ten years ago with a happy family: a couple with three small children. The woman will be in one of the twin towers of New York at the time of the fatal terrorist act and will become one of the many disappeared, whose body was never recovered. Ten years later, one of his daughters (Sara Maldonado) will live passionate and filial loves, learn love as a couple, relearn to be a daughter and bet on the love of journalism, an occupation that will bring risks and personal dilemmas and with which she will live to fight and denounce terrorism.

Cast

Starring 
 Saúl Lisazo as Julián San Millán
 Sara Maldonado as Camila San Millán
 Leticia Huijara as Isabel San Millán
 Erik Hayser as Diego San Millán
 Ximena Rubio as Sofía Rocha

Also starring 
 Alejandra Ambrosi as Julia San Millán
 Arap Bethke as Iván Acosta
 Marco Pérez as Mauricio Álvarez
 Néstor Rodulfo as Pablo Ortíz
 Claudia Ríos as María Flores
 Mario Loría as Facundo Ramírez
 Tamara Mazarraza as Renata García del Bosque
 René García as Augusto Medina
 Constantino Costas as Ignacio Vargas Salcedo

Recurring 
 Patricio Sebastián as Andrés San Millán
 Aldo Gallardo as Ezequiel Cruz
 Alejandro Caso as Ascencio Frías / El Culiacán
 Juan Martín Jauregui as Javier
 Itahisa Machado as Yadira Escalante
 Eréndira Ibarra as Casilda Barreiro
 Shalim Ortiz as Iñaki Arriaga

Spin-off 
The following day after concluding the telenovela, on February 13 a spin-off of the telenovela entitled Infames was released. The spin-off would star Vanessa Guzmán, Luis Roberto Guzmán, Miguel Ángel Muñoz, and Ximena Herrera, with Lisette Morelos, and Eréndira Ibarra as co-stars.

References

External links 
 

Mexican telenovelas
Argos Comunicación telenovelas
Spanish-language telenovelas
2011 Mexican television series debuts
2012 Mexican television series endings
2011 telenovelas